Jan Styka (April 8, 1858 in Lemberg – April 11, 1925 in Rome) was a Polish painter noted for producing large historical, battle-piece, and Christian religious panoramas. He was also illustrator and poet. Known also as a great patriotic speaker - his speeches were printed in 1915 under the French title L'ame de la Pologne (The Soul of Poland).

Biography

The son of a Czech officer in Austria-Hungary, Styka attended school in his native Lemberg (Polish: Lwów, now Lviv) then studied at the Academy of Fine Arts in Vienna, Austria following which he took up residence in Kraków in 1882 where he studied historical painting under Jan Matejko. Next he came back to Lwów and opened there a workshop. Here, together with a celebrated Polish historical painter Wojciech Kossak, they created his most famous work in Poland – The Racławice Panorama. Later he travelled to Italy for a short time before moving to France where the great art movements at Montmartre and Montparnasse were taking shape and where he would spend a large part of his life.

Among Styka's important works is the large scene of Saint Peter preaching the Gospel in the Catacombs (seen here) painted in Paris in 1902. His renowned panoramas include  Bem in Siedmiogrod (1897), The Martydrom of Christians in Nero's Circus (1897), and the Wrocław Branch of the National Museum of Poland houses the monumental collaboration The Battle of Racławice painted in 1894.

Styka died in 1925 and was buried in Rome. However, in 1959 Hubert Eaton arranged with Styka's family for his remains to be brought to the United States for interment in the "Hall of The Immortals" at Forest Lawn cemetery.

Sons  (1889–1954) and Adam Styka (1890–1959) were both painters.

The Crucifixion

In 1910 Styka painted a portrait of esteemed pianist and Polish statesman, Ignacy Jan Paderewski, which is now at the National Museum of Poland in Poznań. Previously, near the end of the 19th century, Paderewski had commissioned Styka to paint what would become his most famous work internationally. Originally entitled "Golgotha" (the Aramaic name for the site of Christ's crucifixion), the painting became known simply as The Crucifixion.

The Crucifixion has a fascinating history.  Upon its commission in 1894, Styka travelled to Jerusalem to prepare sketches, and to Rome, where his palette was blessed by Pope Leo XIII.

The painting was unveiled in Warsaw to great success on June 22, 1897. It was shown in many of the great cities of Europe, before making its way to America, to join the 1904 St. Louis Exposition.
The painting was seized when Styka's American partners failed to pay the customs taxes, and was considered lost for nearly forty years.  In 1944 the painting was found, rolled around a telephone pole and badly damaged, having languished in the basement of the Chicago Civic Opera Company for decades.

Acquired by American businessman, Hubert Eaton, the painting was restored by Jan Styka's son, artist .  It is on display in the Hall of the Crucifixion at Forest Lawn Memorial Park Cemetery in Glendale, California.

In 2005–2006 the painting underwent a massive restoration as part of Forest Lawn's centennial celebration.  It currently is shown, except on Mondays, on the hour, except 1:00 p.m., from 10 a.m. to 4 p.m..  It features a new, state of the art guided light show and narrated presentation written by biblical scholar Timothy Kirk.

Selected paintings

References

External links

Details of the "Panorama of the Battle of Racławice" at the Wroclaw Municipality website
Details of "The Crucifixion" at the Forest Lawn website
Maria Styka family art 

1858 births
1925 deaths
Artists from Lviv
People from the Kingdom of Galicia and Lodomeria
Polish people of Czech descent
19th-century Polish painters
19th-century Polish male artists
20th-century Polish painters
20th-century Polish male artists
Academy of Fine Arts Vienna alumni
Burials at Forest Lawn Memorial Park (Glendale)
Polish male painters
Catholic painters